Jenise May is an American politician and a Democratic member of the Colorado House of Representatives representing District 30 from 2013 to 2015.

Political career
With incumbent Republican Representative Kevin Priola redistricted to District 56, May was unopposed for the District 30 June 26, 2012 Democratic Primary, winning with 1,780 votes; and won the three-way November 6, 2012 General election with 14,130 votes (55.2%) against Republican nominee Mike Sheely (who had run for the House in 1994) and Libertarian candidate Shea Lantz.

May was defeated in the 2014 election by Republican JoAnn Windholz, losing by 106 votes.

References

External links
Official page at the Colorado General Assembly
Campaign site

Place of birth missing (living people)
Year of birth missing (living people)
Living people
Democratic Party members of the Colorado House of Representatives
Women state legislators in Colorado
21st-century American women politicians
21st-century American politicians